Sheikh Hamad bin Thamer bin Mohammed Al Thani (Arabic: حمد بن ثامر بن محمد آل ثاني) is the chairman of the board of the Al Jazeera Media Network, based in Qatar.

Career 
In 1987, Al Thani joined the Ministry of Information and Culture in Qatar as undersecretary to the minister of information until 1994.

In 1996, he launched Al Jazeera. Al Thani served  as director general until the appointment of Dr Mostefa Souag and has served as president of the board of administration.

He is a member of the ruling family of Qatar, the House of Thani.

Al Thani has a journalism degree from Qatar University.

References 

Living people
Hamad bin Thamer A
Place of birth missing (living people)
Qatari businesspeople
Qatari media executives
Year of birth missing (living people)